The Continental Mark IV is a personal luxury car that was marketed by the Lincoln division of Ford Motor Company from the 1972 to 1976 model years.  The third generation of the Mark series, the Mark IV grew in size over its Continental Mark III predecessor.  As with the previous generation, the Mark IV saw little direct competition in the American marketplace, competing nearly exclusively against the Cadillac Eldorado (redesigned for 1971).

As with the Mark III, the Mark IV shared its chassis with the Ford Thunderbird, with the Mark IV receiving its own bodywork below the windows.  Hidden headlights made their return, along with a radiator-style grille, and a Continental spare tire trunklid.   For 1976, the Designer Series option package was introduced; in what would become a tradition for the Mark series (and later Lincoln), the option consisted of specially coordinated exterior and interior trims developed between Lincoln and contemporary fashion designers.

Ford assembled the Continental Mark IV at its Wixom Assembly Plant (Wixom, Michigan) facility alongside the Ford Thunderbird and the Lincoln Continental.  For 1977, the Mark IV underwent a substantial revision, becoming the Continental Mark V.

Design 

Following the successful redesign of the Lincoln Continental for the 1970 model year, Ford Motor Company chose an evolutionary design path for the successor of the Continental Mark III.  With designers again using sharp-edged fenders, hidden headlamps, and a tall radiator-style grille, the Continental Mark IV retained the traditional "long-hood, short deck" coupe proportions of the Mark III along with its "Continental spare tire" decklid. The spare tire was actually stored on a ledge in the trunk on top of the gas tank, immediately behind the rear seat.

In a cost-cutting move, however, Ford Motor Company forced the Mark IV to increase parts commonality with the Ford Thunderbird; while the roofline, doors, and inner body panels were shared, the Mark IV and Thunderbird still were given different outer body panels below the roofline and different interiors.  In a major break from American luxury car tradition, the rear wheel openings of the Mark IV were designed at the same height as the front wheels (similar to the 1966-1970 Oldsmobile Toronado); its large fender flares precluded the use of fender skirts.

In 1973, the front bodywork underwent a major redesign, necessitated by the addition of 5 mph bumpers; in various forms, the front body style would be seen on Continentals and Lincolns until 1989.  For 1974, a 5 mph bumper was added to the rear body work, moving the taillights from the bumper into the rear bodywork.

All Mark IVs were equipped with a vinyl roof.  The Mark IV introduced the opera window to the Mark series, a feature that would be featured in the Mark through the discontinuation of the Mark VI after 1983.  For 1972, it was an almost universally specified option, becoming standard for 1973.

Mechanical specification 
All Mark IVs were equipped with the -4V Ford 385 series 16-valve V8 ("4V" is in reference to the 4-venturi Autolite carburetor).  Rated at 365 hp (gross)in the Mark III, the 460 was carried over to the Mark IV.  For 1972, rated output underwent a numeric decrease to 212 hp.  In order to comply with changing EPA emissions regulations, Ford was required to decrease the compression ratio of the engine.  The same year, American auto manufacturers adopted SAE net horsepower as its standard of measuring engine output, to better reflect real-world engine performance (as installed in vehicles).  All examples of the Mark IV were equipped with a Ford C6 three-speed automatic transmission.

A feature retained from the Mark III was  "Sure-track" brakes.  Both front seats were power adjustable.

Performance was not competitive with contemporary premium personal luxury cars. However, no other "personal luxury" models were six-passenger vehicles, except the Cadillac Eldorado.

Designer Series 
For 1976, to attract further interest to the Mark IV in its final model year, Lincoln-Mercury introduced the "Designer Series" special-edition option package.  Developed entirely for appearance purposes, the four versions of the Designer Series were styled through the consultation of notable fashion designers of the time (Bill Blass, Cartier, Givenchy, and Pucci); each version featured an individually coordinated exterior and interior color combination with specific trim and interior fabrics.  In addition, the opera window was fitted with the signature of the corresponding designer, a 22-karat gold-plated dashboard plaque (which could be engraved with the name of the original owner).

Along with pairing the model line with contemporary designers to attract wider interest in the model line, the Designer Series offered a level of customization (to a smaller extent) not seen since the era of coachbuilt vehicles (not seen in Lincolns since the Model L and Model K).  Since the introduction of the Mark III, Cartier had been associated with the Mark series as the designer of the optional dashboard clock (standard on the Mark IV).  

Following its successful use in the Mark IV, the Designer Series would return for successive generations of the Mark series (with the exception of the Lincoln Mark VIII).  The Cartier edition would see the longest use; following its 1982 shift to the Lincoln Town Car, the edition served as its flagship trim through the 2003 model year.  

For 2017, Lincoln introduced the Black Label series across its model line as a flagship trim.  While not associated with fashion designers, the Black Label continues the use of a themed vehicle design, using a specially coordinated exterior and interior.

Sales and pricing

Specifications (1976 model)

Notes

References 
 Automotive Mileposts. Lincoln Continental kit.  Retrieved on May 7, 2005.

Lincoln Mark Series 

 Lincoln Mark Series

Mark 4
1970s cars
Personal luxury cars